1844 in archaeology

Explorations
 Karl Richard Lepsius examines, describes, and maps Meroë; and partially explores the upper passage of tomb KV20 in the Valley of the Kings.

Excavations
Frances Stackhouse Acton excavates a Roman villa in the grounds of her home at Acton Scott in England.

Finds
 William Reeves locates Nendrum Monastery.
 Discovery of Rudchester Mithraeum.

Publications
  Views of Ancient Monuments in Central America by Frederick Catherwood, with color lithographs of ruins of the Maya civilization.
 March - The Archaeological Journal first published. The first volume includes Frederick Lukis's "Observations on the primaeval antiquities of the Channel Islands" (pp. 144–52).

Births
 August 3 - Marcel-Auguste Dieulafoy, French archaeologist of Iran (d. 1920)

Deaths

See also
 List of years in archaeology
 1843 in archaeology
 1845 in archaeology

References

.
Archaeology
Archaeology by year